Q*bert is a remake of the 1982 arcade game of the same name with 3D graphics. It was developed by Artech Studios and released by Hasbro Interactive (under the Atari brand name) on the PlayStation and Microsoft Windows in 1999 and on the Dreamcast in 2000.

Gameplay
Q*bert has three modes of play. Classic is like the original Q*bert, and the graphics can be changed from Retro to Modern. The Adventure mode takes Q*bert to 3D dimensions, and contains power ups and all new characters set in four worlds, with Q*bert aiming to rescue his friends from Coily. Head to Head is a multiplayer mode.

Reception

Allgame's Brett Weiss praised all aspects of the game, while Parish called it a poor adaptation. Kevin Rice of Next Generation Magazine rated it two stars out of five, and praised the game's graphics, but criticized the new level designs. He further commented that adventure mode was not enjoyable. The game was the winner of Electronic Gaming Monthly's "Puzzle Game of the Year" award.

References

1999 video games
Hasbro games
Video games developed in Canada
Arcade video games
Dreamcast games
Game Boy Color games
PlayStation (console) games
Windows games
MacSoft games
Multiplayer and single-player video games
Artech Studios games
Q*bert
Morning Star Multimedia games
Pipe Dream Interactive games